Matlab Uttar is an upazila of Chandpur District in the division of Chittagong, Bangladesh. The former Matlab Upazila was divided into two in 2000, Matlab Dakshin and Matlab Uttar.

History

During the Mughal period, when the Lalar Hat Bazaar, located on the banks of the Dhanagoda River, a tributary of the Gumti, at the northern end of the present villages of Babu Para and Pail Para, was destroyed by river erosion, a market called Bairagir Hat at the northern end of the Kaladi village was founded by the Jamadar of Matlab. Jealous of this, the Zamindar of Faridpur increased his zamindari and established another market in his name in the western part south of the Bairagir Hat. After some time, both the markets became very competitive and Jamadar's haat bazaar became popularly known as Matlab rather than Bairagir Hat. The name Matlab was gazetted on 9 August 1918. Gazette No. 236. In 1900, the government divided the Chandpur circle and created the Matlab circle. As a result, the progress of police station with 22 unions started.

During the Bangladesh Liberation War of 1971, the area was under the control of Bengali freedom fighters. Whenever the Pakistan Army tried to enter the area, skirmishes would take place. A hospital was established for the wounded freedom fighters in the village of Nishchintapur. There were also mass graves in the village of Harina.

On 30 April 2000, Matlab Uttar Upazila, an archipelago surrounded by the Meghna-Dhanagoda river, started its journey as an independent upazila with 1 municipality and 13 unions (later 1 increase). Later on 5 September of the same year Matlab North started functioning as a newly created upazila. As the adjoining Matlab upazila is on the north side, this upazila was named Matlab Uttar.

Geography
It has a total land area of 277.53 km2.

Administration
Matlab Uttar Upazila is divided into Chengar Char Municipality and 14 union parishads: Baganbari, Durgapur, Eklaspur, Faraji Kandi, Gazra, Islamabad, Jahirabad, Kalakanda, Mohanpur, Paschim Fatehpur, Purba Fatehpur, Sadullapur, Satnal, and Sultanabad. The union parishads are subdivided into 127 mauzas and 251 villages.

Chengar Char Municipality is subdivided into 9 wards and 41 mahallas.

Research
Matlab, including both Matlab Dakshin and Matlab Uttar Upazilas, is also the primary rural field site for the International Centre for Diarrhoeal Disease Research, and the world's longest running health project.

Notable people
Professor Dr. Rafiqul Islam - National Professor, President of Bangla Academy, Chairman of Nazrul Institute and 1st Vice-Chancellor of Jashore University of Science and Technology
Professor Dr. Shamsul Alam - Economicst and current State Minister of Planning
Aziz Ahmed - 16th Chief of Bangladesh Army Staff
Mofazzal Hossain Chowdhury - Awami League, Politician and Former Minister
Md. Nurul Huda - Bangladesh Nationalist Party, Politician and Former Minister
Nawab Ali - first Bengali principal of Dhaka Medical College and Hospital
Wahiduddin Ahmed - 3rd Vice Chancellor of BUET, was an adviser to the interim government led by the then president Justice Shahabuddin Ahmed in December 1990.
Late-Golam Mostafa Mia   Ex.Chairman-9 no-jahirabad union Parisad-Long Time-22 years
Advocate Monowarul Islam   Ex.Chairman-9 no-jahirabad union Parisad-1 Time
Late-Freedomfighter Golam Rabbani Bablu Ex.Chairman-9 no-jahirabad union Parisad-2 Time -11 Years.

See also
Upazilas of Bangladesh
Districts of Bangladesh
Divisions of Bangladesh

References

Matlab Uttar Upazila